Sleepy Hollow is an unincorporated community in Noble Township, Shelby County, in the U.S. state of Indiana.

Geography

References

Unincorporated communities in Shelby County, Indiana
Unincorporated communities in Indiana
Indianapolis metropolitan area